Vietnamese may refer to:

 Something of, from, or related to Vietnam, a country in Southeast Asia
 A citizen of Vietnam. See Demographics of Vietnam.
 Vietnamese people, or Kinh people, a Southeast Asian ethnic group native to Vietnam
 Overseas Vietnamese, Vietnamese people living outside Vietnam within a diaspora
 Vietnamese language
 Vietnamese alphabet
 Vietnamese cuisine
 Vietnamese culture

See also
 List of Vietnamese people
 

Language and nationality disambiguation pages